Ernsta is a genus of spread-wing skippers in the butterfly family Hesperiidae. There are about 14 described species in Ernsta, found mainly in Africa. These species were formerly members of the genus Spialia.

Species
These species belong to the genus Ernsta:

 Ernsta bifida (Higgins, 1924)
 Ernsta colotes (Druce, 1875) (Bushveld Sandman)
 Ernsta confusa (Higgins, 1924) (Confusing Sandman)
 Ernsta delagoae (Trimen, 1898) (Delagoa Sandman)
 Ernsta depauperata (Strand, 1911) (Wandering Sandman)
 Ernsta dromus (Plötz, 1884) (Forest Sandman)
 Ernsta mangana (Rebel, 1899) (Arabian Grizzled Skipper)
 Ernsta nanus (Trimen, 1889) (Dwarf Sandman)
 Ernsta paula (Higgins, 1924) (Mite Sandman)
 Ernsta ploetzi (Aurivillius, 1891) (Forest Grizzled Skipper)
 Ernsta sataspes (Trimen, 1864) (Boland Sandman)
 Ernsta secessus (Trimen, 1891) (Wolkberg Sandman)
 Ernsta wrefordi (Evans, 1951) (Wreford’s Grizzled Skipper)
 Ernsta zebra (Butler, 1888) (Zebra Grizzled Skipper)

References

Further reading

Carcharodini